Pinchas Sadeh, also Pinhas Sadeh, (born in Lemberg, Poland 1929, died January 29, 1994, in Jerusalem, Israel) was a Polish-born Israeli novelist and poet.

Biography
Pinhas Feldman (later Sadeh) was born in Galicia (then part of Poland). His family immigrated to Mandatory Palestine in 1934, settling in Tel Aviv.  He lived and studied in Kibbutz Sarid. Later, he studied in England. Sadeh worked as a shepherd at Kvutzat Kinneret. There he met Yael Sacks, whom he married in 1956 but the union lasted only three months. In 1962-1969, he was married to Yehudit. He began publishing his work in 1945.

Sadeh died in Jerusalem at the age of 64.

Literary career
Sadeh's literary output consisted of six collections of verse, two novels, a novella, four books of essays, a children`s book and a collection of Hassidic folktales.  Sadeh's work addressed elementary existential issues. He spoke of his writing as "theological" and a "moral act." His first poem translated into English, "Proverbs of the Virgins," appeared in Commentary magazine in August 1950. His collections of poetry included Burden of Dumah.  His novels included One Man's Condition and Death of Avimelech. He also wrote an autobiographical account of his early life (up to age 27), Life as a Parable.  Life as a Parable became his most celebrated work. According to one literary critic, it "expressed a 'yearning for religiosity' in a country that sanctified secularism."

Sade also wrote comic books, which he signed with a pseudonym. He was the author of most of the comics published in Haaretz Shelanu, a children's magazine, using the name "Yariv Amazya." Many of his comics were science-fiction based.

Awards and recognition

Sadeh won the 1990 Bialik Prize for Literature, jointly with T. Carmi and Natan Yonatan. He was a 1973 recipient of the Prime Minister's Prize for Hebrew Literary Works.

See also
Hebrew literature
Israeli literature

References

External links
An Existential Treatment of Biblical Theme: Pinhas Sadeh's "The Death of Abimelech"
Pinchas Sadeh’s Religiosity

1929 births
1994 deaths
Polish emigrants to Mandatory Palestine
Polish male novelists
Israeli male novelists
Israeli male poets
20th-century Polish novelists
20th-century Polish poets
Polish male poets
20th-century Polish male writers
Recipients of Prime Minister's Prize for Hebrew Literary Works
Deaths from lung cancer in Israel